Dolega District is a district (distrito) of Chiriquí Province in Panama. The population according to the 2000 census was 17,243. The district covers a total area of 249 km². The capital lies at the city of Dolega.

Administrative divisions
Dolega District is divided administratively into the following corregimientos:

San Francisco de Dolega (capital)
Dos Ríos
Los Anastacios
Potrerillos
Potrerillos Abajo
Rovira
Tinajas
Los Algarrobos

References

Districts of Panama
Chiriquí Province